Impactite is rock created or modified by one or more impacts of a meteorite. Impactites are considered metamorphic rock, because their source materials were modified by the heat and pressure of the impact. On Earth, impactites consist primarily of modified terrestrial material, sometimes with pieces of the original meteorite.

Creation 
When a large meteorite hits a planet, it can radically deform the rocks and regolith that it hits. The heat, pressure, and shock of the impact changes these materials into impactite. Only very massive impacts generate the heat and pressure needed to transform a rock, so impactites are created rarely.

Characteristics
Impactite includes shock-metamorphosed target rocks, melts (suevites) and mixtures of the two, as well as sedimentary rocks with significant impact-derived components (shocked mineral grains, tektites, anomalous geochemical signatures, etc.). In June 2015, NASA reported that impact glass has been detected on the planet Mars. Such material may contain preserved signs of ancient life—if life existed. Impactites are generally classified into three groups: shocked rocks, impact melt, and impact breccias.

Shocked rock 
Shocked rocks have been transformed by shock metamorphism caused by the impact. They include shatter cones and high-pressure minerals, for example coesite and stishovite.

Impact melts 
When a meteor strikes a planet's surface, the energy released from the impact can melt rock and soil into a liquid. The liquid then cools and becomes an impact melt. If the liquid cools and hardens quickly into a solid, impact glass forms before the atoms have time to arrange into a crystal lattice. Impact glass can be dark brown, almost black, and partly transparent.  Sometimes, the cooled liquid does form a crystal structure. In that case, it would still be considered an impact melt, but not an impact glass.

Impact breccias 

Breccia is "a rock consisting of angular fragments cemented together". An impact breccia is formed when a meteor shatters a rock and then cements it back together. Some breccias contain impact melts.

Examples of impactite

Impactite has been found, for example, at the following impact craters and structures:
 Alamo bolide impact (Late Devonian), Nevada, United States
 Alga crater on the planet Mars
 Barringer crater, Arizona, United States
 Charlevoix impact structure, Québec, Canada
 Darwin Crater, Tasmania (source of Darwin glass)
 Lake Lappajärvi, Finland (source of Kärnäite)
 Manicouagan impact structure, Québec, Canada
 Neugrund crater, Estonia
 Nördlinger Ries crater, Germany 
 Rochechouart impact structure, France
 Stac Fada Member, Scotland
 Wabar craters, Saudi Arabia

See also
 Glossary of meteoritics
 Meteorite shock stage
 Vitrified sand

References

External links

 Meteorite crater glossary

Metamorphic rocks
Sedimentary rocks
Meteorite mineralogy and petrology
Impact event minerals
Glass in nature